Ivan Ivanovich Kataev (27 May 1902 – 19 August 1937) was a Soviet novelist, short story writer, and journalist.

Biography
Kataev was born in Moscow. His father was the uncle of Andrey Kolmogorov, and his mother was the niece of Pyotr Kropotkin. In 1919 he joined the Red Army and the RKP (b) and participated in the fighting against Anton Denikin. After leaving the military, Kataev studied in the Economic Department of Moscow State University.

Kataev's first works were published in 1921. From 1926 to 1932 he was the leader of the literary group Pereval, which included Eduard Bagritsky, Mikhail Prishvin and Pyotr Pavlenko, among others. His works include the novellas The Heart (1928), Milk (1930), and The Encounter (1934). and the collections of essays Movement (1932) and The Man on the Mountain (1934).

He made numerous long trips as a journalist to the Kuban, Altai Republic, Kola Peninsula, Armenia and many other places, which provided him with material for his fiction.

His novel Milk was attacked on ideological grounds as a work that preached religion. His works were attacked throughout the mid 1930s, eventually leading to his arrest and execution as an "enemy of the people" in 1937. He was rehabilitated in 1956.

English translations
Immortality, from Anthology of Soviet Short Stories, Vol 1, Progress Publishers, Moscow, 1976.
The Wife, from Great Soviet Short Stories, Dell, 1990.

References

1902 births
1937 deaths
Soviet novelists
Soviet male writers
20th-century male writers
Soviet short story writers
20th-century short story writers
Soviet journalists
Male journalists
Executed writers
Soviet rehabilitations
Writers from Moscow
Moscow State University alumni
Great Purge victims from Russia
Soviet military personnel
20th-century journalists